Derived stems are a morphological feature of verbs common to the Semitic languages. These derived verb stems are sometimes called augmentations or forms of the verb, or are identified by their Hebrew name binyan (literally meaning "construction"), and sometimes correspond with additional semantic meaning such as passive or causative action. 

Semitic languages make extensive use of nonconcatenative morphology, and most words share a set of two, three or four consonants which comprise a root wherein each root may be the basis for a number of conceptually related words. Traditionally, words are thought of as being derived from these root consonants, but a view increasingly held by contemporary linguists sees stem words being the source of derivations rather than consonantal roots. Regardless, each language features a number of set patterns for deriving verb stems from a given root or underived stem. Stems sharing the same root consonants represent separate verbs, albeit often semantically related, and each is the basis for its own conjugational paradigm. As a result, these derived stems are considered part of the system of derivational morphology, and not conjugation or inflection.

Typically, one stem is associated with the ordinary simple active verbs while others may be canonically associated with other grammatical functions such as the passive, the causative, the intensive, the reflexive, etc., or combinations thereof. These functions should not be taken as universal or absolute, but are better understood as relational, depending on the particular source of the derived stem. These grammatical functions are also not present in all Semitic languages. Some Modern Aramaic languages, for example, have only two stems, one for monosyllabic verbs and the other for disyllabic verbs, with hardly any cases of related verbs in each stem.

Synchronic examples 

For example, in Arabic and Hebrew, words containing the root √k-t-b have a meaning related to writing (in Hebrew, a phonological process known as begadkefat, alters the quality of certain consonants when they follow a vowel, so b becomes v and k becomes ḵ (a voiceless velar fricative like German Bach); the symbol ː indicates the preceding consonant is doubled or geminate). Thus:
 In the basic stem, "he wrote" in Arabic is "kataba", and in Hebrew is "katav".
 In a causative stem, "he dictated" in Arabic is "ʔaktaba" and in Hebrew is "hiḵtīv".
 In the passive stem, "it was written" in Arabic is "inkataba" and in Hebrew is "niḵtav".
 In a reflexive stem, "he corresponded" in Arabic is "kātaba" and in Hebrew is "hitkatːēv".
The following two tables show the full paradigm of templates for the nine most common Arabic stems and the seven most common Hebrew stems, and illustrate some of the different meanings and functions that stems can have.

The first column gives the traditional stem abbreviation used by Comparative Semiticists and the second column gives typical stem names used in Arabic and Hebrew grammars; the Arabic system uses Roman numerals, and the Hebrew uses binyanim forms with the root letters √p-ʕ-l (with p sometimes becoming f by begadkefat). The next columns give the canonical functions of each stem, and their templates (the three Cs stand in for the three Consonants of the root, and V stands for some Vowel). Finally, the meaning and form of the stems with the √k-t-b root is given in the 3rd person masculine singular perfect, which lacks inflectional affixes.

The tD Stem for Arabic is not given for the √k-t-b root because it does not occur, illustrating that not each root has an actual form for each stem; in fact, √k-t-b has a more complete stem paradigm than many other roots.

In each Semitic language, the number of derived stems is different. In Hebrew, both biblical and modern, there are seven common ones, and in Arabic there are nine common forms and at least six rare ones; Akkadian has thirteen common patterns, Ugaritic has ten, Syriac has six, some Modern Aramaic languages have two, and so on.

Comparative morphology
There are different ways of naming stems, most systems classify stems by their morphological patterns but others simply number them. In Arabic, a system using Roman numerals is frequently used, as well as a more traditional system where the forms with the root letters √f-ʕ-l (roughly meaning "to do") are used as names of each stem. Hebrew also uses this latter system, although the cognate root used is √p-ʕ-l (with p sometimes surfacing as f by begadkefat). In Akkadian, forms with the √p-r-s root "to decide" are most often used. The convention using Latin letter abbreviations (such as G, Dt and Š) is a morphological shorthand used most often by comparative Semiticists, and emphasizes the relationships between stems within and between languages. 
 G-Stem is the base stem, from the German Grund ("ground")  
 D-Stem typically has a Doubled second root letter  
 L-Stem typically Lengthens the first vowel 
 N-Stem has a prefix with N 
 C- or Š-Stem often has a Causative meaning and has a prefix with Š (ʃ pronounced like English sh), S, H, or ʔ (the glottal stop).  
 t Stems (such as tG, tD, and Št) have an affix with t.
The following table compares some of the important stems of six different Semitic languages: Akkadian, Biblical Hebrew, Syriac, Standard Arabic, Geʿez, and Shehri (aka Jibbali), representing different Semitic subfamilies. By examining these and a few other forms, and using the comparative method and internal reconstruction, the Grammatical Function and Template for the Proto-Semitic derived stems have been reconstructed. The asterisk (*) in the Proto-Semitic Template column indicates that these forms are hypothetical and reconstructed.  

Because the L Stem is only attested in the geographically and genetically proximate Arabic and South Semitic languages, it is thought to be a later innovation, not present in Proto-Semitic. By contrast, since separate but morphologically similar Št and ŠtG Stems are attested in the relatively distantly related Akkadian and Shehri, these are posited to have been different stems in Proto-Semitic, but to have merged in most later Semitic languages.

References

External links 
Pattern-and-root inflectional morphology: the Arabic broken plural
  Alexis NEME  and Eric Laporte, Do computer scientists deeply understand Arabic morphology? - هل يفهم المهندسون الحاسوبيّون علم الصرف فهماً عميقاً؟ (available also in Arabic, Indonesian, French)

Afroasiatic verbs
Linguistic morphology
Semitic linguistics